Bethanie Mattek-Sands and Sania Mirza were the defending champions, but both players could not participate this year due to injuries.

Kiki Bertens and Demi Schuurs won the title, defeating Andreja Klepač and María José Martínez Sánchez in the final, 7–5, 6–2.

Seeds

Draw

Draw

References
Main Draw

Brisbane International - Doubles
Women's Doubles